Michael David Saville Peck (1914-1968) was Dean of Lincoln from 1965 to 1968.

Peck was born on 7 January 1914, educated at King's College School, Cambridge,  Sedbergh and King's College, Cambridge  and ordained in 1937. He was a Curate at Holy Cross, Greenford until 1946 and then Vice-Principal of St Chad's College, Durham until 1949. Later he was Vicar of St Mark's, Mansfield and then Archdeacon of Portsmouth before his elevation to the Deanery in 1965. He died in post on 22 April 1968.

Notes

1914 births
People educated at Sedbergh School
Alumni of King's College, Cambridge
Archdeacons of Portsmouth
Deans of Lincoln
1968 deaths